The Purwa Falls is a waterfall in Rewa district in the Indian state of Madhya Pradesh.It falls under Semariya, a town in Rewa district.It is nearby Basavan Mama, a sacred and tourist place.

The falls
The Tamsa River while descending through the Rewa Plateau and draining northwards makes a vertical falls of  known as the Purwa Falls.

The Purwa Falls is an example of a nick point caused by rejuvenation. Knick point, also called a nick point or simply nick, represents breaks in slopes in the longitudinal profile of a river caused by rejuvenation. The break in channel gradient allows water to fall vertically giving rise to a waterfall.

References

Waterfalls of Madhya Pradesh
Tourist attractions in Rewa district